Montreal Westmounts was a Canadian football team in Ontario Rugby Football Union. The team played in the 1939 season.

Canadian Football Hall of Famers
John Ferraro

ORFU season-by-season

References
CFLapedia - Montreal

CFLapedia - 1939 newspaper articles

The Montreal Gazette - Nov 11, 1939

Ontario Rugby Football Union teams
Defunct Canadian football teams
Ind
1939 establishments in Quebec
Sports clubs established in 1939
Sports clubs disestablished in 1939
1939 disestablishments in Quebec